The following is the qualification system and qualified countries for the diving at the 2023 Pan American Games competition in Santiago, Chile.

Qualification system
A total of 80 divers (40 per gender) will qualify to compete. A nation may enter a maximum of 10 divers (if entering teams in synchronized diving) or 6 athletes (if not entering teams in synchronized diving), with the exception of the winners of the 2021 Junior Pan American Games, provided that these athletes participate only in the event in which they qualified in Cali. The host nation (Chile) automatically qualified a full team of 10 athletes (five per gender). The top 18 men and women in individual events in the 2022 and 2023 FINA World Championships will secure spots for their NOCs. In addition, at each of the CONSANAT Championships (Zone 1) and the PAQ Qualifying Diving Championships (Zone 2), divers from federations competing in such events may earn a quota position for their NOCs provided that the total number of divers from such Zones do not exceed 24 divers on all boards (including those who are ranked in FINA from such competing federations but excluding any divers from CHI). Zone 3 and 4 divers do not have separate qualifiers within their zones. National championships or trials events in Zones 3 and 4 may be used to name divers to already qualified positions. 

 minimum of 20 and up to 24 divers, each federation within Zone 1 limited to a maximum of 10 divers; 
 minimum of 20 and up to 24 divers, each federation within Zone 2 limited to a maximum of 10 divers;

Qualification timeline

Qualification summary

Synchronized diving

Men's 3 m synchronized springboard

Men's 10 m synchronized platform

Women's 3 m synchronized springboard

Women's 10 m synchronized platform

Individual diving

Men's 1 m springboard
For the individual events, one diver can only gain a single quota place per event for their NOC.

Men's 3 m springboard
For the individual events, one diver can only gain a single quota place per event for their NOC.

Men's 10 m platform
For the individual events, one diver can only gain a single quota place per event for their NOC.

Women's 1 m springboard
For the individual events, one diver can only gain a single quota place per event for their NOC.

Women's 3 m springboard
For the individual events, one diver can only gain a single quota place per event for their NOC.

Women's 10 m platform
For the individual events, one diver can only gain a single quota place per event for their NOC.

References

2022 in diving
Qualification for the 2023 Pan American Games